Peter Johan Lore was born in the Netherlands and soon emigrated to South Africa. He completed his studies in Librarianship and Library Science at the University of Stellenbosch and the University of Pretoria in South Africa and at the University of Caen in France. He received a Bible. Honors (an honors degree in Library Science) from the University of Stellenbosch as well as a Masters in Library Science from the University of Pretoria and also was granted his D.Phil. in Library and Information Science from the University of Pretoria in 1990. In 2008, he was awarded an Honorary Doctorate of Philosophy from the University of Pretoria for his extraordinary professional work in different associations and as a professor and researcher in Library Science.

Throughout his varied career as a professor, librarian, manager, and researcher, Peter Lor has been passionate about issues of International Librarianship, specifically the development of libraries around the world.  As a practitioner, Lor served in various libraries in South Africa as well as holding the position of senior librarian at the University of Pretoria (1976–80). He also worked as the director of South Africa's State Library for eight years. In 1999, the National Library of South Africa was created by merging the State Library in Pretoria and the South African Library in Cape Town. Lor became the first National Librarian, responsible for this merger. Peter Lore was also active in the creation of the Library and Information Association of South Africa. This association replaced former library associations that had been segregated along racial lines. Further, he was involved in developing national library policies for post-apartheid South Africa. 
 
In addition to his active role in the Library and Information Association of South Africa (LIASA)in its early years (1996-2000), he served in a variety of capacities in other organizations such as the  International Federation of Library Associations and Institutions (IFLA) and the Conference of Directors of National Libraries (CDNL). From February 2005 until September 2008, he served as the Secretary General of IFLA. He has also served as a consultant on library development and has worked as an advocate for libraries in the World Summit on the Information Society.

As for his extensive teaching experience, Lore began as an associate professor and then a professor in Information Science at the University of South Africa (1986-1992). He has also taught at the University of Pretoria in the Department of Information Science. As of January 2009, he is a visiting professor at the University of Wisconsin-Milwaukee in the School of Information Studies.

Peter Lore is the author of around 150 professional and research publications. In 2019 his International and Comparative Librarianship: Concepts and Methods for Global Studies  was published as part of the IFLA series, Global Studies in Library and Information.

Some of Peter Lore's most recent research interests include:

 Developmental role of libraries in developing countries
 National and regional information policy
 Library and information services legislation
 Information flows between developed and developing countries
 International and comparative librarianship and information work
 National digital heritage: capturing, organization, preservation and access
 Research methods in library and information science

Awards
 2008 - DPhil (honoris causa)
 2020 - 2020 John Ames Humphry/OCLC/Forest Press Award

References

University of Pretoria alumni
Living people
Year of birth missing (living people)
Dutch emigrants to South Africa
Stellenbosch University alumni
South African librarians